= Three-quarter view =

Three-quarter view and Two-thirds view may refer to:

- The three-quarter profile (or two-third) in portraits
- The three-quarter perspective (2.5D) in video games
